The Dawood Foundation Magnifi-Science Exhibition is a yearly science exhibition that aims to promote the culture of science and informal learning through exhibits, experiments and expositions.  The yearly science exhibition takes place in Karachi, Pakistan. Around 20,000 student from 55 schools participated on the first day. Chief Minister Murad Ali Shah and Education Minister Jam Mehtab Hussain Dahar also attended the exhibition. Some scientific research groups participated in this exhibition.  The main focus of the exhibition is to encourage young children to get involved with scientific studies and activities.

Gallery

References

Science exhibitions
Education in Pakistan